Hourglass is the 13th studio album by American folk rock duo America, released by American Gramaphone in 1994. This was America's first new studio album since 1984's Perspective. Two singles were released from the album, "Young Moon" and "Hope", but did not chart in the U.S. The songs did receive more airplay in Europe. The song "Hope" became a theme song for the TJ Martell Foundation and was recorded by a group of country music stars in a fundraising effort for the Foundation.  The recording of "You Can Do Magic" included here is not the hit version but a re-recording that is very similar.

Actor/musician Bill Mumy contributed to this album, co-writing "Sleeper Train" and "Greenhouse" and providing additional guitar work.

Reception

AllMusic asserted that the album "sounds both familiar and fresh" and that the songs are uniformly excellent, a surprise for a band as old as America. The opening track "Young Moon" "is as good as any of the group's hits."

Track listing

References

America (band) albums
1994 albums
Albums produced by Steve Levine
American Gramaphone albums